Saur is a French company specialized in water management and leisure management.

History 
Saur was created in 1933 by Pierre Crussard as a water resource management company. Initially the company was exclusively a water facilities construction company, but beginning in 1934, it started water exploitation and distribution.

References

Water companies of France
1933 establishments in France